Anne Katrine Hansen (born 13 July 1996) is a Danish female badminton player.

Achievements

BWF International Challenge/Series
Women's Doubles

 BWF International Challenge tournament
 BWF International Series tournament
 BWF Future Series tournament

References

External links 
 

Living people
1996 births
Danish female badminton players